In mathematics, a negligible function is a function  such that for every positive integer c there exists an integer Nc such that for all x > Nc,

Equivalently, we may also use the following definition.
A function  is negligible, if for every positive polynomial poly(·) there exists an integer Npoly > 0 such that for all x > Npoly

History
The concept of negligibility can find its trace back to sound models of analysis.  Though the concepts of "continuity" and "infinitesimal" became important in mathematics during Newton and Leibniz's time (1680s), they were not well-defined until the late 1810s.  The first reasonably rigorous definition of continuity in mathematical analysis was due to Bernard Bolzano, who wrote in 1817 the modern definition of continuity.  Later Cauchy, Weierstrass and Heine also defined as follows (with all numbers in the real number domain ):

(Continuous function) A function  is continuous at  if for every , there exists a positive number  such that  implies 

This classic definition of continuity can be transformed into the
definition of negligibility in a few steps by changing parameters used in the definition.

(Infinitesimal) A continuous function  is infinitesimal (as  goes to infinity) if for every  there exists  such that for all 

Next, we replace  by the functions  where  or by  where  is a positive polynomial. This leads to the definitions of negligible functions given at the top of this article.

Use in cryptography

In complexity-based modern cryptography, a security scheme is
provably secure if the probability of security failure (e.g.,
inverting a one-way function, distinguishing cryptographically strong pseudorandom bits from truly random bits) is negligible in terms of the input  = cryptographic key length .  Hence comes the definition at the top of the page because key length  must be a natural number.

Nevertheless, the general notion of negligibility doesn't require that the input parameter  is the key length .  Indeed,  can be any predetermined system metric and corresponding mathematical analysis would illustrate some hidden analytical behaviors of the system.

The reciprocal-of-polynomial formulation is used for the same reason that computational boundedness is defined as polynomial running time: it has mathematical closure properties that make it tractable in the asymptotic setting (see #Closure properties). For example, if an attack succeeds in violating a security condition only with negligible probability, and the attack is repeated a polynomial number of times, the success probability of the overall attack still remains negligible.

In practice one might want to have more concrete functions bounding the adversary's success probability and to choose the security parameter large enough that this probability is smaller than some threshold, say 2−128.

Closure properties

One of the reasons that negligible functions are used in foundations of complexity-theoretic cryptography is that they obey closure properties. Specifically,

 If  are negligible, then the function  is negligible.

Examples

  is negligible for any .
 is negligible.
 is negligible.
 is negligible.
 is not negligible, for positive .

Given: n > 0 and limit as n-> infinity:

Negligible:

Non-negligible:

See also
Negligible set
Colombeau algebra
Nonstandard numbers
Gromov's theorem on groups of polynomial growth
Non-standard calculus

References

 
 
 
 
 

Mathematical analysis
Types of functions